The Schmiddis (also: Schmiddisbach) is one of the  headstreams of the river Haslach. It is situated in the region of Upper Swabia in Baden Württemberg, Germany.

Geography 
The Schmiddis is a small stream which has its source in the hamlet of Schmiddis near Treherz, part of the municipality of Aitrach in the district of Ravensburg. It runs in a northerly direction for 3 kilometres, It joins the Rappenbach at the  retention basin Rappenbach, forming the river Haslach.

Two bridges cross the Schmiddis, one for the state road 314, and a second one close to the mouth of the stream near the retention basin Rappenbach.

See also 
 List of rivers of Baden-Württemberg

References

External links 

Rivers of Baden-Württemberg
Rivers of Germany